Curtis L. Shaw (March 1, 1888 – February 19, 1944) was mayor of Murray, Utah from 1942 to 1943.  He was born in Union, Utah March 1, 1888. He was educated in the Fort Union area and was a farmer up to the time he moved to Murray in 1921. He was a general construction contractor since 1908 where he built homes as well as two power plants in Murray and one in Bountiful Canyon. He was a member of the Murray Lions Club for 14 years and was the chapter's vice president.

His tenure for mayor was noted for his opposition to transforming the city into a city manager form of government. His campaign called referred to such a government as creating a "dictator."  He was defeated for re-election and died the year he left office.

References 

1888 births
1944 deaths
Mayors of Murray, Utah
20th-century American politicians